Devon McLean (18 November 1904 – 1 May 1967) was a Guyanese cricketer. He played in three first-class matches for British Guiana from 1924 to 1927.

See also
 List of Guyanese representative cricketers

References

External links
 

1904 births
1967 deaths
Guyanese cricketers
Guyana cricketers